The greater swamp warbler (Acrocephalus rufescens) is a species of Old World warbler in the family Acrocephalidae.
It is found in Angola, Botswana, Burundi, Cameroon, Central African Republic, Chad, Republic of the Congo, Democratic Republic of the Congo, Equatorial Guinea, Gabon, Ghana, Kenya, Mali, Mauritania, Namibia, Nigeria, Rwanda, Senegal, South Sudan, Tanzania, Togo, Uganda, Zambia, and Zimbabwe.
Its natural habitat is swamps.

References

External links

 Greater swamp warbler  - Species text in The Atlas of Southern African Birds.

greater swamp warbler
Birds of the Gulf of Guinea
Birds of Sub-Saharan Africa
greater swamp warbler
Taxonomy articles created by Polbot